The Yards is a 2000 American crime film directed by James Gray, written by Gray and Matt Reeves, and starring Mark Wahlberg, Joaquin Phoenix, Charlize Theron and James Caan.

Set in the commuter rail yards in New York City ("the yards"), specifically in the boroughs of the Bronx, Queens, and Brooklyn, where contractors repair railway cars for the city Transit Authority (TA), bribery, corporate crime and political corruption are commonplace, as rival companies sabotage each other's work to win bids, and the undercutting leads to murder.

Plot
Leo Handler rides the subway to his mother Val's house in Queens, New York, where she throws a surprise party celebrating his parole. His cousin Erica Soltz is at the party with her boyfriend Willie, who takes Leo aside and thanks him for serving time in prison, implying that Leo had taken a fall for their gang of friends. Leo is eager to find a job to support his mother, as she has a heart condition. Willie suggests working for Erica's stepfather, Frank Olchin.

The next day, at the railway car repair company Frank owns, Leo is encouraged to enter a 2-year machinist program and Frank offers to help finance his studies. Needing work immediately, Leo asks about working with Willie for the company but Frank discourages that idea. Willie advises Leo not to worry about it, saying Frank also tried to get him into a machinist program.

At Brooklyn Borough Hall, Willie explains how corrupt the contract system is for repair work on the subway. After a hearing to award contracts, Hector Gallardo approaches Willie about leaving Frank's firm for his. Willie brushes him off, taking Leo with him to Roosevelt Island, where he bribes an official in charge of awarding contracts.

One night, Willie takes Leo to a rail yard, where he and a gang sabotage the work of Gallardo's firm in order to lower their quality rating and lessen their ability to get contracts. Leo is told to stand watch while the crew sabotages the train couplings. Willie heads into the yard master's office to pay him off with Knicks tickets, but is told to get his crew off the tracks, Gallardo having brought him $2,000 in cash. The yard master sounds the alarm, which draws a police officer. Terrified of returning to jail, Leo tries to run. When the cop begins to hit Leo with his night stick, Leo beats him into unconsciousness. As he runs off, he sees Willie kill the yard master.

With the cop in a coma at a hospital, the crew tells Leo that he must murder the officer to prevent him from identifying Leo when he awakens because if the cop lives, Leo will die. Upon awakening, the cop identifies Leo as his attacker, triggering a broad manhunt. The police assume Leo also killed the yard master. When they raid his mother's apartment, she has a heart attack, weakening her even further.

Despite Willie's instructions to lay low, Leo emerges from hiding to visit his sick mother. Tending to her, Erica discovers Willie was with Leo at the yards and realizes Willie actually killed the yard master, consequently breaking up with him. Frank disowns Willie, who tries unsuccessfully to accept a deal offered to him earlier by Gallardo for protection.

Erica implores Frank to help, but instead Leo realizes that Frank is prepared to kill him. Out of options, Leo turns to Gallardo for protection. With Gallardo's lawyers beside him, Leo turns himself in at a public hearing into the rail yard incident and contract corruption. Realizing that the injured cop's testimony against Leo is in no one's interest, Frank and Gallardo negotiate a new split of the contracts with Queens Borough President Arthur Mydanick in a backroom deal.

Willie goes to see Erica, trying to win her back. Frank has told him that Erica and Leo had been in love when they were younger, and once were caught having sex. Fearing his temper and jealousy, Erica triggers the silent house alarm. Willie tries to embrace her, but as she pulls away, he accidentally throws Erica off the second floor landing, sending her falling to her death. Outside the house, he surrenders to the police, who have responded to the alarm.

Police enter the hearing to inform Erica's mother Kitty and Frank of Erica's death.

After Erica's funeral, Frank takes Leo aside to promise help in the future, if he stays quiet at a hearing by the Attorney General. Leo disgustedly turns away and joins the grieving Kitty and the rest of the family.

Leo testifies against Frank and the others involved in the political corruption surrounding The Yards.

(Note: A previous editor wrote that the director's cut excluded Leo testifying.)

Cast

In addition, David Zayas appears as Officer Jerry Rifkin, while actual New York City based news anchors Roma Torre, Lewis Dodley (as Louis Dodley) and Ernie Anastos play news anchors seen reporting on incidents in the film.

Production
The film's director and co-screenwriter, James Gray, based the film on an actual corruption scandal in the mid-1980s, which involved his father.

The New York City Transit Authority, known as the MTA, initially disallowed the production companies from filming at any of its yards because it believed the film negatively portrayed the agency.

Filming locations included Roosevelt Island, Maspeth and Elmhurst, Queens, the Bronx, and New Jersey. The railyard scenes were shot at the MTA's Inwood, Manhattan, 207th Street Yard and shop, as well as an abandoned freight yard in Brooklyn.

It was shot in the spring and summer of 1998 butdue to studio delaysnot released until the fall of 2000.

Reception
On the review aggregator website Rotten Tomatoes, the film has an approval rating of 64%, based on 96 reviews, with an average rating of 5.93/10. The website's consensus reads, "Featuring strong performances and direction, The Yards is a richly textured crime thriller with an authentic feel."

Box office
On a relatively limited release, the film, which had a $24 million budget, took in just $889,352 in the United States and Canada, and $34,684 in Australia.

Awards

Won
 National Board of Review Awards (2000):
 Best Supporting Actor: Joaquin Phoenix
 Broadcast Film Critics Association (2001):
 Best Supporting Actor: Joaquin Phoenix

Nominated
 Cannes Film Festival (2000):
 Golden Palm Nomination: James Gray

References

External links
 
 
 
 

2000 films
2000 crime drama films
2000s English-language films
American crime drama films
Films about corruption in the United States
Films directed by James Gray
Films scored by Howard Shore
Films set in New York City
Films shot in New York City
Films shot in New Jersey
Films with screenplays by James Gray
Films with screenplays by Matt Reeves
Miramax films
2000s American films